Uprise is the fourth studio album by the Dutch alternative rock band Nemesea, who are famous in the Netherlands for combining rock music with electronica. For this album, one lyric video, one official music video, and an audio samples video have been released so far.

Track listing

Personnel 
Nemesea
Manda Ophuis – vocals, lyrics
Sonny Onderwater – bass
Hendrik Jan de Jong – guitars, keyboards, backing vocals, programming, lyrics, songwriting

Guest appearances
Cubworld - male vocals on "The Way I Feel"
Jasper Blokzijl - piano on "The Way I Feel"
Dor Friedman - orchestrations on "Broken"
Niels Lingbeek - songwriting on "Get Out"
Jasper Dijkstra - backing vocals on "Let It Burn" and "Light Up The Sky"
Jan Henk de Groot - backing vocals on "Let It Burn" and "Light Up The Sky"
Freek van der Heide - songwriting on "Let It Burn"
Jeroen Sjoers - songwriting on "Let It Burn"
Steven Bouma - drums, percussion
Ruben Wijga - piano on "Let It Burn" and "Light Up The Sky", programming
Joost van den Broek - piano on "If You Could"
Bas Veeren - programming on "No More"
Guido Aalbers - programming on "No More"

Crew
Stefan Heilemann - artwork, photography
Dor Friedman - recording "If You Could"
Ruben Wijga - programming
Darius van Helfteren - mastering
Guido Aalbers - producer, recording, engineering, mixing

Preproduction was done at Key Studios and Mastersound Studios

References

External links 

2016 albums
Nemesea albums
Napalm Records albums
Electronic rock albums